Anton Fritz Gragger (born c. 1920s) is an Austrian chess player and Austrian Chess Championship medalist (1948, 1951).

Biography
From the late 1940s to the early 1960s, Anton Fritz Gragger was one of Austrian leading chess players. In  Austrian Chess Championship he twice won bronze medals: 1948 and 1951. In 1961, Gragger represented Austria in the FIDE Zonal tournament.

Gragger played for Austria in the Chess Olympiads:
 In 1962, at fourth board in the 15th Chess Olympiad in Varna (+6, =3, -7),
 In 1964, at fourth board in the 16th Chess Olympiad in Tel Aviv (+7, =2, -6).

Gragger also played for Austria in qualifying competitions of the European Team Chess Championship (1963) and international team matches.

Gragger was an engineer by profession.

References

External links

Anton Fritz Gragger chess games at 365chess.com

1920s births
Possibly living people
Year of birth uncertain
Austrian chess players
Chess Olympiad competitors